Mirreyes contra Godínez or Mirreyes vs Godínez, is a 2019 Mexican comedy film directed by Chava Cartas. The film premiered on 25 January 2019, and is stars Pablo Lyle, Daniel Tovar, Regina Blandón, and Diana Bovio. The plot revolves around the death of a wealthy shoemaker, after his death begins a hilarious battle between the "Mirreyes" (preppy guys) and the "Godínez" (working class guys) to gain control of the company.

Cast 
 Pablo Lyle as Santi
 Daniel Tovar as Génaro
 Regina Blandón as Michelle
 Diana Bovio as Nancy
 Roberto Aguire as Ricardo
 Claudia Ramírez as Emilia
 Christian Vázquez as Conan
 Hernán Mendoza as Don Francisco
 Gloria Stalina as Sofía
 Alejandro de Marino as Shimon

Sequel 
After the success of the film, on 31 October 2019 the newspaper El Universal Mexico confirmed that the film would have a sequel, which began filming in February 2020. Mirreyes contra Godínez 2: El retiro was released on 21 July 2022.

References

External links 
 

Mexican comedy films
2019 comedy films
2010s Spanish-language films